Nicky Lee may refer to:
 Nicky Lee (author)
 Nicky Lee (singer)
 Nicky Lee (priest)

See also
 Nick Lee (disambiguation)